Aurel Ciupe (May 16, 1900 – July 18, 1988), was a Romanian painter, educator, and museum director. He authored numerous portraits, and landscape paintings, and worked within the Fauvism movement. Ciupe was a professor at the Institute of Fine Arts in Cluj, and served as a director of the Museum of Banat (now National Museum of Banat).

Biography 
Aurel Ciupe was born on May 16, 1900 in Lugoj, Kingdom of Romania (now Romania). He attended secondary school in Lugoj, and graduated in 1918. 

Ciupe moved to Budapest to study fine art and law after secondary school. However because of the political situation and the Hungarian–Romanian War, he moved to Bucharest to continue his studies at the National University of Arts Bucharest (now Bucharest National University of Arts). In 1919, Ciupe received a scholarship from the governing council to study fine art in Paris, where he attended Académie Julian until 1922. In 1924, he moves to Rome to continue his studies at Accademia di Belle Arti di Roma, under painter Umberto Coromaldi.

After leaving Rome, he briefly moved to Târgu Mureş to join his family. Followed by a move in 1925 to Cluj to join the newly formed "Institute of Fine Arts" in Cluj (now Art and Design University of Cluj-Napoca). He also worked as the Museum of Banat (now National Museum of Banat) in Timișoara. In 1928, Ciupe won the first prize at the Bucharest Art Salon.

In 1933, he moved to Târgu-Mureş to work as a museum director at the public art gallery, and took a teaching position at the public art university.

References

External links

1900 births
1988 deaths
People from Lugoj
20th-century Romanian painters
Accademia di Belle Arti di Roma alumni
Académie Julian alumni
Bucharest National University of Arts alumni
Fauvism
Academic staff of the Art and Design University of Cluj-Napoca
Directors of museums in Romania
People from Târgu Mureș